Allen Evan Shawn (born August 27, 1948) is an American composer, pianist, educator, and author who lives in Vermont.

His music
Shawn began composing at the age of ten, but dates his mature work from 1977. He has written a dozen orchestral works, including a symphony, two piano concertos, a cello concerto, and a violin concerto; three chamber operas; five piano sonatas and many additional works for piano; and a large catalogue of chamber music, songs and choral music. Among Shawn's available recordings are several of chamber music, four CDs of piano music, including a CD devoted to his piano work by German pianist Julia Bartha, a Piano Concerto performed by Ursula Oppens with the Albany Symphony Orchestra under the direction of David Alan Miller, and the chamber opera The Music Teacher, with a libretto by his brother, Wallace Shawn.

As author
Shawn is the author of a book about Austrian composer Arnold Schoenberg, Arnold Schoenberg's Journey, and a book about Leonard Bernstein, Leonard Bernstein: An American Musician.

He is also the author of Wish I Could Be There: Notes from a Phobic Life, which examines his experiences with anxiety and panic disorder, as well as his relationship with his autistic twin sister Mary, and Twin: A Memoir, also about Mary and his relationship with her.  He discussed Twin with Terry Gross on WHYY's Fresh Air on January 3, 2011.

Personal life
Shawn is the son of The New Yorker editor William Shawn, and the brother of the actor and playwright Wallace Shawn. His family is of Jewish background. He received a bachelor's degree from Harvard University, a master's degree from Columbia University, and studied in France with Nadia Boulanger.

He teaches composition and music history at Bennington College and was formerly married to novelist Jamaica Kincaid, with whom he has a son, Harold, and a daughter, Annie.

He is married to pianist Yoshiko Sato, with whom he has a son, Noa.

Books
 Arnold Schoenberg's Journey (New York: Farrar, Straus and Giroux, 2002)
 Wish I Could Be There: Notes from a Phobic Life (New York: Viking, 2007)
 Twin: A Memoir (New York: Viking, 2011)
 Leonard Bernstein: An American Musician (New Haven: Yale University Press, 2014)

References

External links
Allen Shawn biography
 Terry Gross Fresh Air interview with Allen Shawn, NPR.org, February 20, 2007.
 Allen Shawn at the Internet Off Broadway Database
 Allen Shawn Biography at Chaspen Foundation for the Arts
 Resume at Bennington College

1948 births
20th-century American composers
20th-century American male musicians
20th-century classical composers
21st-century American composers
21st-century American male musicians
21st-century classical composers
American classical composers
American male classical composers
American music educators
Bennington College faculty
Classical musicians from New York (state)
Columbia University alumni
Educators from New York City
Harvard University alumni
Jewish American classical composers
Living people
Musicians from New York City
People from Bennington, Vermont
Writers from New York City
American twins
21st-century American Jews